Dead Man is the debut studio album by Swedish psychedelic rock band Dead Man, released on January 25 on CD and February 25, 2006 on LP by Crusher Records.

Track listing
"Goin' Over the Hill" – 4:50
"Haunted Man" – 5:20
"Mumbo Gumbo" – 3:01
"Season of the Dead" – 5:03
"Further" – 6:18
"Highway" – 3:53
"Deep Forest Green " – 14:02

Personnel

Dead Man 
Guitar, Percussion, Vocals - Johan Rydholm
Guitar, Percussion, Vocals - Kristoffer Sjödahl 
Bass, Synthesizer [Moog], Xylophone, Piano, Vocals - Joakim Dimberg 
Drums, Percussion, Vocals - Marcus Allard 
Additional Personnel
Engineer - Christopher God, John Rönneklev 
Harmonica - Peter Carlsson (track: 3) 
Mastered By - Henryk Lipp 
Producer - Christopher God, Dead Man, John Rönneklev 
Artwork By - Fredrik Fogelqvist

References

External links
 

2006 debut albums
Dead Man (band) albums